India participated in the 2010 Summer Youth Olympics in Singapore.

The Indian squad comprised 32 athletes competing in 13 sports: aquatics (swimming), archery, athletics, badminton, basketball, boxing, judo, rowing, shooting, table tennis, tennis, weightlifting and wrestling.

Medalists
Medals awarded to participants of Mixed-NOC teams are represented in (italics). These medals are not counted towards the Individual NOC Medal tally.

Archery

Athletics

Boys
Track and Road Events

Field Events

Girls
Track and Road Events

Badminton

Boys

Basketball

Boys

Boxing

Boys

Judo

Individual

Rowing

Shooting

Swimming

Table tennis

Tennis

Singles

Weightlifting

Wrestling

Freestyle

References

External links
Competitors List: India

Nations at the 2010 Summer Youth Olympics
2010 in Indian sport
India at the Youth Olympics